The list of ship decommissionings in 1941 includes a chronological list of all ships decommissioned in 1941.


May

29 May

October

Unknown date 
 :  Decommissioned for transfer to the Royal New Zealand Navy

Unknown date 
 
 

See also 

1941
1941-related lists
 Decommissionings